De Waard is a Dutch occupational surname meaning "the innkeeper" or "landlord". Variant (archaic) spellings are De Waardt, De Waart, De Weerd, De Weerdt and De Weert. Notable people with the surname include:

De Waard
 Cornelis de Waard (1879–1963), Dutch historian
 Dirk de Waard (1919–2011), Dutch-born American geologist
 Elly de Waard (born 1940), Dutch poet
 Maaike de Waard (born 1996), Dutch swimmer
 Orin de Waard (born 1983), Curaçao footballer
 Raymond de Waard (born 1973), Dutch footballer
 Steven de Waard (born 1991), Australian tennis player
 Sytse Klaas de Waard (1796–1856), Dutch Mennonite teacher and minister
 Xan de Waard (born 1995), Dutch field hockey player
De Waart
 Edo de Waart (born 1941), Dutch conductor
 Paula de Waart (1876–1938), Dutch film actress
De Weerdt
 Adriaen de Weerdt (c.1510–c.1590), Flemish painter
De Weert
 Anna De Weert (1867–1950), Belgian painter
 Kevin De Weert (born 1982), Belgian racing cyclist
 Sebald de Weert (1567–1603), Dutch admiral and explorer

Dutch-language surnames
Occupational surnames